Total Mayhem is an isometric action video game developed by American studio Cinematix and published by Domark in 1996 for Windows.  It featured music by Ronny Moorings of the band Clan of Xymox.

Gameplay
Total Mayhem is a game in which the player commands units on missions to kill robots.

Reception
Next Generation reviewed the PC version of the game, rating it two stars out of five, and stated that "There are plenty of missions, some interesting weapons, and a variety of enemies, which, along with network support, keeps Total Mayhem from being a total loss, but it's certainly not enough to make this one a legend."

Reviews
PC Gamer (1996 August)
Computer Games Magazine (1996)
Computer Gaming World (Aug, 1996)
GameSpot - Jun 11, 1996
PC Player (Germany) - Aug, 1996
PC Multimedia & Entertainment (Jun 16, 1996)
World Village (Gamer's Zone) (1997)
Gamezilla (1996)

References

1996 video games
Action video games
Domark games
Video games developed in the United States
Video games with isometric graphics
Windows games
Windows-only games